Mentha longifolia (also known as horse mint, fillymint or St. John's horsemint; syn. M. spicata var. longifolia L., M. sylvestris L., M. tomentosa D'Urv, M. incana Willd.) is a species in the genus Mentha (mint) native to Europe excluding Britain and Ireland, western and central Asia (east to Nepal and the far west of China), and northern and southern (but not tropical) Africa.
It is a very variable herbaceous perennial plant with a peppermint-scented aroma. Like many mints, it has a creeping rhizome, with erect to creeping stems 40–120 cm tall. The leaves are oblong-elliptical to lanceolate, 5–10 cm long and 1.5–3 cm broad, thinly to densely tomentose, green to greyish-green above and white below. The flowers are 3–5 mm long, lilac, purplish, or white, produced in dense clusters (verticillasters) on tall, branched, tapering spikes; flowering in mid to late summer. It spreads via rhizomes to form clonal colonies.

Nicholas Culpeper's Complete Herbal (1653) states that "It is good for wind and colic in the stomach ... The juice, laid on warm, helps the King's evil or kernels in the throat ... The decoction or distilled water helps a stinking breath, proceeding from corruption of the teeth, and snuffed up the nose, purges the head. It helps the scurf or dandruff of the head used with vinegar." In addition, Mentha longifolia, like other Mentha species, is known to have important medicinal properties.

Subspecies
There are seven subspecies:
Mentha longifolia subsp. longifolia, Europe, northwest Africa
Mentha longifolia subsp. capensis (Thunb.) Briq., southern Africa
Mentha longifolia subsp. grisella (Briq.) Briq., southeastern Europe
Mentha longifolia subsp. noeana (Briq.) Briq., Turkey east to Iran
Mentha longifolia subsp. polyadena (Briq.) Briq., southern Africa
Mentha longifolia subsp. typhoides (Briq.) Harley., northeast Africa, southwest Asia
Mentha longifolia subsp. wissii (Launert) Codd., southwestern Africa
It has been widely confused with tomentose variant plants of Mentha spicata; it can be distinguished from these by the hairs being simple unbranched, in contrast to the branched hairs of M. spicata.
Like almost all mints, Mentha longifolia can be invasive. Care needs to be taken when planting it in non-controlled areas.

See also
 Menthol
 Pulegone

References

longifolia
Flora of Asia
Plants described in 1753
Taxa named by Carl Linnaeus
Flora of Africa
Flora of Europe